The National Organ Transplant Act (NOTA) of 1984 is an Act of the United States Congress which established the framework for the U.S. organ transplant system. The act clarified the property rights of human organs from deceased individuals and created a public-private partnership known as the Organ Procurement and Transplantation Network (OPTN), which was empowered to manage organ allocation on a national basis. 

Since the initial network contract was finalized in 1986, the United Network for Organ Sharing (UNOS) has served as the OPTN under contract with the U.S. Department of Health and Human Services. OPTN policies are developed by a broad community that includes donation and transplant clinicians and professionals. NOTA and subsequent federal regulation call on the OPTN to emphasize fair and equitable patient access to transplantation, as well as reliance on objective medical evidence and adaptability to evolution in clinical treatment and scientific understanding.

History
Before NOTA was put in place, there was no clear jurisdiction on what property rights were for a human corpse. Instead, America applied a "quasi-right" to a corpse. This meant that the relatives of a deceased person had a possessory right long enough to decide how to bury or dispose of the corpse. This contrasts with a property right in that they do not have a right to transfer, devise, possess, or lease the human organs and tissues.

Due to a shortage in organs and a growing demand for transplantations, people began to use other means to purchase organs outside of a hospital setting; the organ market began to become a commercial market. H. Barry Jacobs, the head of a Virginia company, announced in 1983 a plan to buy and sell human organs on the market. This plan put healthy human kidneys in the price range of up to $10,000 plus a $2,000 to $5,000 commission fee for Jacobs.  NOTA was a response to this proposal, making it criminal to transfer human organs for valuable consideration for the purposes of human transplantation.

At the time NOTA was passed, there was an 80% survival rate for kidney transplants. A new drug, cyclosporin, had also increased the survival rate of liver transplant patients from 35% to 70% in a patient's first year after undergoing a liver transplant. The legislation was aware of a growing need and growing organ shortage when NOTA was passed.

NOTA made it illegal to compensate organ donors but did not prevent payment for other forms of donations (such as human plasma, sperm, and egg cells). Although bone marrow is not an organ or a component of an organ, the act made paying bone marrow donors illegal. At the time the act was passed, donating bone marrow involved a painful and risky medical procedure. In the years after the act was passed, a new procedure (apheresis) made it possible to harvest bone marrow cells through a non-surgical procedure similar to blood donation. In 2009, a public interest law firm (The Institute for Justice) sued to allow donors to be compensated for giving bone marrow. The firm argued that the development of apheresis meant that donors who gave bone marrow through blood donation should be allowed to receive compensation. The organization predicted that allowing compensation would increase the pool of available donors, and claimed that 3,000 Americans die each year while waiting for compatible marrow donors. Critics argued that allowing compensation could reduce donation, increase the risk of disease, and lead to the exploitation of the poor. In December 2011, the Ninth Circuit Court of Appeals unanimously ruled that donors giving bone marrow via apheresis were eligible for compensation. In November 2013, the federal government proposed a regulation that would change legal definitions to cover bone marrow regardless of how it is obtained. This would have the effect of keeping the ban on compensating donors in place. As of July 2014, the proposal was still under review.

Sections of NOTA

Title I - Task Force on Organ Procurement and Transplantation
Title I states the Secretary of Health and Human Services will establish a Task Force on Organ Procurement and Transplantation to regulate how deceased donor organs are handled and who receives transplantations and the process one must go through in regards to a deceased donor organ transplantation along with other lines of duty. This Task Force is composed of 25 members.

Duties of the Task Force include:
handling all medical, legal, ethical, economic, and social issues that may rise from obtaining deceased human organs and the transplantation of them.
assessing immunosuppressive medication used to prevent organ rejection in transplant patients, including safety, effectiveness, costs, insurance reimbursements, and making sure those who need these drugs can receive them
prepare a report including assessments of public and private efforts to obtain deceased human organs, problems in obtaining these organs, recommendations for education and training of health professionals and for education of the general public
assessment of the effectiveness and of establishing a national registry of deceased human organ donors

Title II - Organ Procurement Activities
Title II established the Organ Procurement Organizations (OPO) for deceased organ transplants. These OPO's are designed to increase the number of registered deceased organ donors and when those donors become available, they coordinate the donation process from donor to patient.

NOTA also established the Organ Procurement and Transplantation Network (OPTN), a membership organization transplant-related individuals and organizations, primarily transplant centers. OPTN is currently administered by the private, non-profit organization, United Network for Organ Sharing (UNOS), in Richmond, Virginia. OPTN operates under the authority of the Health Resources and Services Administration (HRSA) of the U.S. Department of Health and Human Services. Robert Walsh is the current Project Officer for OPTN.

Their duties include:
"facilitating the deceased organ matching and placement process through the use of the computer system and a fully staffed Organ Center operating 24 hours a day"
"developing consensus based policies and procedures for deceased organ recovery, distribution (allocation), and transportation"
"collecting and managing scientific data about organ donation and transplantation"
"providing data to the government, the public, students, researchers, and the Scientific Registry of Transplant Recipients for use in the ongoing quest for improvement in the field of solid organ allocation and transplantation"
"developing and maintaining a secure Web-based computer system, which maintains the nation's deceased organ transplant waiting list and recipient/donor organ characteristics"; and,
"providing professional and public education about donation and transplantation, the activities of the OPTN and the critical need for donation."

The Act also introduced a scientific Federal Registry of all the recipients of organ transplants. This registry includes patient information and transplant procedures.

Title III - Prohibition of Organ Purchases
NOTA specifically states "it shall be unlawful for any person to knowingly acquire, receive, or otherwise transfer any human organ for valuable consideration for use in human transplantation if the transfer affects interstate commerce."  The penalty of breaking this law is a fine of $50,000 or up to five years in prison, or both.

Title IV - Miscellaneous
NOTA created a "national registry of voluntary bone marrow donors."  Donors on this list have given informed consent and their names are kept confidential. This registry is upheld by the Secretary of Health and Human Services.

Amendments

1988
The 1988 Amendment of NOTA introduced the Organ Procurement Organizations and Organ Procurement and Transplantation Network explained in detail in Title II of NOTA.

1990
The 1990 Amendment of NOTA introduced the Federal Registry.

Ethics
Some believe that if organ transplantation is a commercial process, incentives for the disfranchised and poor would be created to manipulate them into being more willing to donate. To these detractors, putting a purchase price on a body part resembles slavery and treats a class of people as subhuman. Also, the buying and selling of organs for transplantation as a business arrangement has the potential to lead to misrepresentation of a donor’s medical information, especially if they were in poor financial shape.

References

United States federal health legislation
1984 in law
United States